Kenneth Bernard Bynum (born May 29, 1974) is a former American football running back in the National Football League. He played for the San Diego Chargers (1997–2000). The 5'11", 191 pound running back went to South Carolina State University for college. He was drafted in the fifth overall round of the 1997 NFL Draft by the San Diego Chargers and was the 138th overall pick. In 1997, he played in 13 games, rushed 30 times for 97 yards and scored no touchdowns. In 1998, he played in 10 games and had 11 rushing attempts for 23 yards and 4 receptions for 27 yards. In 1998, he played in 16 games and had 92 rushing attempts for 287 yards and a touchdown to go along with 16 receptions for 209 yards and two touchdowns. In 2000, he played in 11 games and had only 7 rushing attempts for 26 yards and two receptions for 13 yards.

1974 births
Living people
Players of American football from Gainesville, Florida
American football running backs
South Carolina State Bulldogs football players
San Diego Chargers players